was the third (and final) daimyō of Sano Domain in Shimotsuke Province, Honshū, Japan (modern-day Tochigi Prefecture) under then Bakumatsu period Tokugawa shogunate. His courtesy title was Settsu-no-kami, later Shinano-no-kami and his Court rank was Junior Fifth Rank, Lower Grade.

Biography
Hotta Masatsugu was the son of Hotta Masamoto, but as his father died young, he succeeded his grandfather, Hotta Masahira as daimyō of Sano. Despite his young age, he had good political acumen and capable advisors. He is noted for opening a han school. He was received in formal audience by Shogun Tokugawa Iesada in 1857. In 1868, he declared for the new Meiji government and supplied weapons to the new armies fighting to overthrow the Tokugawa shogunate. He was received by Emperor Meiji later that year, and in 1869 was appointed imperial governor of Sano.

After the Meiji Restoration, with the abolition of the han system in 1871 he relocated to Tokyo. In 1884, he was raised to the kazoku peerage title of shishaku (viscount).

See also
Hotta clan

References

 The content of much of this article was derived from that of the corresponding article on Japanese Wikipedia.

Further reading
 Kurotaki, Jūjirō (1984). Tsugaru-han no hanzai to keibatsu 津軽藩の犯罪と刑罰. Hirosaki: Hoppō shinsha.

External links
of  the Hotta clan of Sano Domain

Fudai daimyo
Hotta clan
1842 births
1896 deaths
Kazoku
People of the Boshin War
People of Meiji-period Japan